Lewis Roberts-Thomson (born 8 September 1983 in Sydney) is a former Australian Rules Football player, who played for the Sydney Swans in the Australian Football League. He has been colloquially known to fans and commentators as either "LRT" or the "Hyphenator".

Roberts-Thomson was drafted by the Swans from the NSW-ACT U18s with the 29th selection in the 2001 AFL Draft.

AFL career
After being injured for most of the 2002 season, he was awarded an AFL Rising Star nomination in his tenth game in 2003, after making his debut in Round 8.  He was then injured again for most of the 2004 season with thumb and achilles injuries.

His performance as a key defender in 2005, including his performance in that year's Grand Final against the West Coast Eagles, secured a permanent position in the Swans' backline.

After an injury riddled 2008 season, Roberts-Thomson not only re-solidified his place at CHB in the Swans' defence in 2009, he improved vastly through the season playing on some of the best forwards in the AFL.

In 2010, Roberts-Thomson continued his strong form and with Craig Bolton suffering a serious Achilles tendon injury early in the year, he and Heath Grundy stepped up manfully to take on the brunt of the defensive work. He injured his hamstring about halfway through the year and was forced to sit out the rest of the season.

For Roberts-Thomson, 2011 was an up and down year as injury and the rapid improvement from Ted Richards and Alex Johnson didn't allow for him to take up his normal position as a tall defender. Consequently, he was used mostly as a 2nd ruckman and tall forward when in the senior side. Illness to Grundy allowed Roberts-Thomson to take up a position in the backline late in the year however, a role that he would fill well for the Swans' run into the finals.

In Round 2 of the 2012 season, Roberts-Thomson reached life membership of the Swans in 2012 after playing his 150th game. He would go on to play in the Swans 2012 Premiership side who were victorious over Hawthorn.

After managing only nine appearances across the 2013 and 2014 seasons, Roberts-Thomson announced his retirement from AFL football in August 2014.

Personal life
Roberts-Thomson is a rarity in AFL as he grew up playing rugby union as a contemporary of Wallaby Phil Waugh at Sydney Church of England Grammar School. Having only taken up Australian rules football at age 14, he had played less than 40 Aussie rules matches when he was drafted in 2001, although he had already been named in the 2001 under-18 All-Australian team.

His father Barry has played in the Victorian Football Association for Sandringham and also captained the Queensland representative side. He became engaged to girlfriend Zoe Stenmark in 2011, they married at Shore Chapel in 2013.

Statistics

|- style="background-color: #EAEAEA"
! scope="row" style="text-align:center" | 2003
|
| 30 || 16 || 5 || 4 || 46 || 44 || 90 || 29 || 12 || 0.3 || 0.3 || 2.9 || 2.8 || 5.6 || 1.8 || 0.8
|-
! scope="row" style="text-align:center" | 2004
|
| 30 || 7 || 0 || 1 || 12 || 22 || 34 || 7 || 4 || 0.0 || 0.1 || 1.7 || 3.1 || 4.9 || 1.0 || 0.6
|- style="background:#eaeaea;"
! scope="row" style="text-align:center" | 2005
|
| 30 || 25 || 0 || 3 || 95 || 103 || 198 || 58 || 37 || 0.0 || 0.1 || 3.8 || 4.1 || 7.9 || 2.3 || 1.5
|-
! scope="row" style="text-align:center" | 2006
|
| 30 || 24 || 3 || 1 || 129 || 116 || 245 || 87 || 30 || 0.1 || 0.0 || 5.4 || 4.8 || 10.2 || 3.6 || 1.3
|-style="background:#eaeaea;"
! scope="row" style="text-align:center" | 2007
|
| 30 || 2 || 0 || 0 || 14 || 15 || 29 || 13 || 3 || 0.0 || 0.0 || 7.0 || 7.5 || 14.5 || 6.5 || 1.5
|-
! scope="row" style="text-align:center" | 2008
|
| 30 || 24 || 4 || 1 || 152 || 134 || 286 || 108 || 48 || 0.2 || 0.0 || 6.3 || 5.6 || 11.9 || 4.5 || 2.0
|-style="background:#eaeaea;"
! scope="row" style="text-align:center" | 2009
|
| 30 || 21 || 2 || 0 || 175 || 156 || 331 || 144 || 28 || 0.1 || 0.0 || 8.3 || 7.4 || 15.8 || 6.9 || 1.3
|-
! scope="row" style="text-align:center" | 2010
|
| 30 || 14 || 0 || 2 || 114 || 80 || 194 || 87 || 34 || 0.0 || 0.1 || 8.1 || 5.7 || 13.9 || 6.2 || 2.4
|-style="background:#eaeaea;"
! scope="row" style="text-align:center" | 2011
|
| 30 || 15 || 12 || 5 || 71 || 44 || 115 || 42 || 39 || 0.8 || 0.3 || 4.7 || 2.9 || 7.7 || 2.8 || 2.6
|-
! scope="row" style="text-align:center" | 2012
|
| 30 || 22 || 25 || 10 || 125 || 98 || 223 || 76 || 47 || 1.1 || 0.5 || 5.7 || 4.5 || 10.1 || 3.5 || 2.1
|-style="background:#eaeaea;"
! scope="row" style="text-align:center" | 2013
|
| 30 || 4 || 1 || 1 || 22 || 14 || 36 || 7 || 6 || 0.3 || 0.3 || 5.5 || 3.5 || 9.0 || 1.8 || 1.5
|-
! scope="row" style="text-align:center" | 2014
|
| 30 || 5 || 2 || 1 || 21 || 12 || 33 || 13 || 9 || 0.4 || 0.2 || 4.2 || 2.4 || 6.6 || 2.6 || 1.8
|- class="sortbottom"
! colspan=3| Career
! 179
! 54
! 29
! 976
! 838
! 1814
! 671
! 297
! 0.3
! 0.2
! 5.5
! 4.7
! 10.1
! 3.7
! 1.7
|}

References

External links

1983 births
Living people
Sydney Swans players
Sydney Swans Premiership players
North Shore Australian Football Club players
Australian rules footballers from New South Wales
NSW/ACT Rams players
Footballers who switched code
Australian rugby union players
People educated at Sydney Church of England Grammar School
Two-time VFL/AFL Premiership players